Fair Zone or Cairo Fair is a station on Cairo Metro, part of phase 2 of Line 3. It is located on Salah Salem Street in front of the Cairo International Fair Ground, one of the most important commercial and administrative centers of Cairo.

Overview
Cairo Fair Station was inaugurated on 7 May 2014 as part of phase 2 of Line 3.

In addition, the station has a contactless fare collection system as well as an integrated supervision and communication system supplied by the Thales Group.

Station layout

Notable places nearby
 Cairo International Book Fair
 State Information Service
 General Authority for Investment

See also
 Cairo Metro
 Cairo Metro Line 3
 List of Cairo metro stations

References

Cairo metro stations
2014 establishments in Egypt
Railway stations opened in 2014